Jiang Yan was a poet and cifu writer in the Southern Dynasty of China, who occupies an important position in the history of the Southern Dynasty literature.

Jiang Yan stated that he loved the strange and different, and therefore sought new social trends and literary habits. This affected his friendships and writing style.

See also
Six Dynasties poetry

444 births
505 deaths
Liu Song poets
Southern Qi poets
Liang dynasty poets
Southern Qi politicians
Liang dynasty politicians
Liu Song politicians
5th-century Chinese poets